The Last Moment is a 1923 American silent horror film directed by J. Parker Read Jr. and starring Henry Hull, Doris Kenyon and Louis Wolheim.

Cast
 Henry Hull as Hercules Napoleon Cameron
 Doris Kenyon as Alice Winthrop
 Louis Wolheim as The Finn
 Louis Calhern as Harry Gaines
 William Nally as Big Mike
 Mickey Bennett as Danny
 Harry Allen as Pat Rooney
 Donald Hall as Mr. Winthrop
 Danny Hayes as Bartender
 Jerry Peterson as The thing
 Robert Hazelton as The butler

Status
Today the film is lost.

References

Bibliography
 Soister, John T., Nicolella, Henry & Joyce, Steve. American Silent Horror, Science Fiction and Fantasy Feature Films, 1913-1929. McFarland, 2014.

External links
 

1923 films
1923 horror films
1920s English-language films
American silent feature films
American horror films
American black-and-white films
Goldwyn Pictures films
Silent horror films
1920s American films